Raymond Jonathan Macias (born September 18, 1986) is an American former professional ice hockey defenseman who played in the National Hockey League (NHL) for the Colorado Avalanche.

Playing career
Macias was drafted 124th overall in the 2005 NHL Entry Draft by the Colorado Avalanche from the Kamloops Blazers of the Western Hockey League. After his final year with the Blazers, Macias was signed by the Avalanche to a three-year, entry level contract on April 11, 2007.

Macias made his professional debut in the 2007–08 season, with the Lake Erie Monsters of the AHL. Upon the end of the season he was sent to junior affiliate, the Johnstown Chiefs of the ECHL, for their playoff run. In the 2008–09 season, Macias started the year with the Chiefs before spending the majority of the season with the Monsters. On March 31, 2009, Macias received his first NHL recall. He made his NHL debut with the Avalanche in a 3-0 defeat to the Phoenix Coyotes on April 1, 2009.

During the 2010–11 season, on January 1, 2011, Macias played in his 160th game for the Monsters which became the most games played by a player in franchise history, a record previously held by Wes O'Neill and later surpassed by Justin Mercier. Macias finished the season with 183 career games for the Monsters before leaving as a free agent from the Avalanche.

Unable to attract an NHL contract, Macias signed a one-year contract with the Reading Royals of the ECHL on September 21, 2011. Despite attending the Los Angeles Kings training camp on a try-out for the 2011–12 season, Macias returned to the Royals to play the majority of the season. He posted 20 points in 38 games while also experiencing two short stints played in the AHL for the Springfield Falcons and the Toronto Marlies.

On June 24, 2012, Macias signed his first European contract, a one-year deal with German second division team, Schwenninger Wild Wings. In the 2012–13 season with the Wild Wings, whilst finishing as finalists, Macias placed second amongst blueliners in scoring with 18 points in 39 games.

On July 31, 2013, Macias remained abroad to sign a one-year contract in the United Kingdom with Braehead Clan of the EIHL. Macias contributed with 2 goals and 5 points in 8 games with the Clan, before opting to be released from his contract in order to return home and spend time away from professional hockey on November 4, 2013.

On June 23, 2014, Macias returned to professional hockey, signing as a free agent to a one-year contract in the Slovak Extraliga with HC ’05 Banská Bystrica. After he was released from his contract without appearing for the club, Macias remained in Europe, agreeing to an initial two week trial with Hungarian club, Alba Volán Székesfehérvár who compete in the EBEL on September 1, 2014. Unable to secure a playing contract in Europe, he signed a contract with the Utah Grizzlies on January 23, 2015.

On August 5, 2015, Macias continued his professional career in the ECHL, signing as a free agent to a one-year deal with the Wichita Thunder. After attending the Thunder's training camp in preparation for the 2015–16 season, Macias was released from his contract on October 8, 2015.

Career statistics

Awards and honors

References

External links

1986 births
Living people
American men's ice hockey defensemen
Braehead Clan players
Colorado Avalanche draft picks
Colorado Avalanche players
Ice hockey players from California
Johnstown Chiefs players
Kamloops Blazers players
Lake Erie Monsters players
Sportspeople from Long Beach, California
Reading Royals players
Springfield Falcons players
Toronto Marlies players
Utah Grizzlies (ECHL) players
American expatriate ice hockey players in Canada
American expatriate ice hockey players in Scotland
American expatriate ice hockey players in Germany